The Philippine Senate Committee on Tourism is a standing committee of the Senate of the Philippines.

Jurisdiction 
According to the Rules of the Senate, the committee handles all matters relating to Philippine tourism and the tourist industry.

Members, 18th Congress 
Based on the Rules of the Senate, the Senate Committee on Tourism has 11 members.

The President Pro Tempore, the Majority Floor Leader, and the Minority Floor Leader are ex officio members.

Here are the members of the committee in the 18th Congress as of September 24, 2020:

Committee secretary: Maria Clarinda R. Mendoza

See also 

 List of Philippine Senate committees

References 

Tourism
Tourism in the Philippines